Skandagiri, also known as Kalavara Durga, is a mountain fortress located approximately 62 km from Bangalore city, and 3 km from Chikballapur in the Indian state of Karnataka.  It is off Bellary Road (National Highway 7 Hyderabad-Bangalore Highway), and overlooks Nandi Hills and Muddenahalli. The peak is at an altitude of about 1450 meters. It is accessed from Kalavara village, which has population of 1093 according to 2011 census.

References

Mountains of Karnataka
Buildings and structures in Chikkaballapur district
Geography of Chikkaballapur district